is a private junior college in Chikugo, Fukuoka, Japan, established in 1970.

External links
 Official website

Japanese junior colleges
Educational institutions established in 1970
Private universities and colleges in Japan
Universities and colleges in Fukuoka Prefecture

ja:九州大谷短期大学